Hellenic Karate Federation (ELOK) is the governing body for Karate in Greece. It aims to govern, encourage and develop the sport for all throughout the country.

The federation organizes the national Karate events, and European and World championships hosted by Greece.

External links
 Official website

Federation
Karate
Organizations based in Athens
Sports organizations established in 1989
1989 establishments in Greece
Karate organizations